José Luis Friaza Pérez (born 12 May 2002) is a Spanish professional footballer who plays as a forward for Elche CF Ilicitano.

Club career
Born in Estepa, Seville, Andalusia, Friaza played for local sides Estepa Industrial CD, EF Peloteros Sierra Sur and Puente Genil FC before joining Elche CF's youth setup in 2020. He made his senior debut with the latter's reserves on 17 April 2021, coming on as a second-half substitute in a 0–1 Tercera División away loss against Atlético Saguntino.

Definitely promoted to the B-side ahead of the 2021–22 campaign, Friaza scored his first senior goal on 12 September 2021, netting the second of a 2–0 away win over CF Recambios Colón. On 28 November, he scored a brace in a 5–0 home routing of Silla CF.

Friaza made his first team debut for the Franjiverdes on 20 January 2022, replacing Guido Carrillo in extra time of a 1–2 home loss to Real Madrid in the season's Copa del Rey.

References

External links
 
 
 

2002 births
Living people
People from Sierra Sur (Seville)
Sportspeople from the Province of Seville
Spanish footballers
Footballers from Andalusia
Association football forwards
La Liga players
Tercera División players
Tercera Federación players
Elche CF Ilicitano footballers
Elche CF players